Mischa Auer (born Mikhail Semyonovich Unkovsky (Михаил Семёнович Унковский; 17 November 1905 – 5 March 1967) was a Russian-born American actor who moved to Hollywood in the late 1920s. He first appeared in film in 1928. Auer had a long career playing in many of the era's best known films. He was nominated for the Academy Award for Best Supporting Actor in 1936 for his performance in the screwball comedy My Man Godfrey, which led to further zany comedy roles. He later moved into television and acted in films again in France and Italy well into the 1960s.

Early life
Auer was born in St. Petersburg, Russia. His name is usually seen as Mischa Ounskowsky, Mischa being the German transliteration of Misha (the diminutive form of Mikhail), and Ounskowsky being the French transliteration of his surname. Auer's father was a Russian naval officer whose own mother was the daughter of Hungarian-born violinist Leopold Auer Auer's mother was Nadine Pelikan. His father died when he was three, and he was taken in by his grandfather. Leopold Auer emigrated to the United States after the Russian Revolution. Mischa Auer and his mother became separated, but were reunited during the Russian Civil War. She, however, died of typhus. Auer was able to contact his grandfather, who brought the teenager to the United States in August 1920.

Career
Auer began performing on the stage in the 1920s in Bertha Kalich's Thalia Yiddish Theater, then moved to Hollywood, where he first appeared in 1928 in Something Always Happens. He appeared in several small, mostly uncredited roles into the 1930s, appearing in such films as Rasputin and the Empress, Viva Villa!, The Yellow Ticket, the George Gershwin musical Delicious, the Paramount Pictures all-star revue Paramount on Parade and The Lives of a Bengal Lancer.

In 1936, Auer was cast as Alice Brady's protégé in the comedy My Man Godfrey, for which he was nominated for the Academy Award for Best Supporting Actor. Prior to that, he had been mostly playing villains. He stated, "That one role made a comic out of me." From then on, he was regularly cast in zany comedy roles. Auer played the ballet instructor Kolenkov in the Best Picture-winning You Can't Take It with You and the prince-turned-fashion designer in Walter Wanger's Vogues of 1938.  Auer can also be seen cavorting in such films as: Arsène Lupin (1932), One Hundred Men and a Girl, Hold That Ghost, Destry Rides Again, Spring Parade, Hellzapoppin', Cracked Nuts, Lady in the Dark, and Up in Mabel's Room (1944). He was also one of the large cast of And Then There Were None, and appeared in a pair of vehicles for opera singer Lily Pons.

In the 1950s, Auer appeared on several episodic television series, such as Westinghouse Desilu Playhouse, Studio One, Broadway Television Theatre and The Chevrolet Tele-Theatre. He appeared in Orson Welles' Mr. Arkadin (1955), and in the 1960s, he made several films in France and Italy, including The Christmas That Almost Wasn't.

Personal life
Auer married four times and had three children.  His first wife was Norma Tillman (1931–1941), whom he married in 1931. They had a son Anthony and a daughter Zoia. They divorced in 1941. In the same year, he married Joyce Hunter (4 December 1941 – 1950), his second wife, whom he lived with for 9 years. His third wife was Susanne Kalish (5 May 1950 – 1957), and they had one daughter. His fourth wife was Elise Souls Lee (1965–5 March 1967) who died in 1976.

Philanthropy
Auer paid the utility bills of the Holy Virgin Mary Russian Orthodox Cathedral (in Los Angeles) for several years.

Death
Auer died of cardiovascular disease in Rome in 1967 and was interred at Prospect Hill Cemetery in Gloversville, New York.

Selected filmography

References

External links

1905 births
1967 deaths
Male actors from Saint Petersburg
American male film actors
American people of Hungarian-Jewish descent
Soviet emigrants to the United States
Yiddish theatre performers
Emigrants from the Russian Empire to the United States
20th-century American male actors
Jewish American male actors
20th-century American Jews